Thiyagi is a 1947 Indian Tamil-language film directed by Ramjibhai Arya and S. R. Krishna Ayyangar and featured V. N. Janaki and N. Krishnamurthi in the lead roles.

Plot
The story is of a dalit girl. The son of a wealthy Zamindar who was educated abroad, falls in love with the dalit girl. The girl is prevented from entering a temple by the priest. She undergoes various difficulties in life owing to the lowly status of her caste. The film exposed the difficulties faced by oppressed people including proscription from entering temples.

Cast
The following list is adapted from The Hindu article and from the database of Film News Anandan.

V. N. Janaki
N. Krishnamurthi
V. S. Mani
Stunt Somu
K. Devanarayanan
K. S. Angamuthu
Thodi Kannan
Kolathu Mani
T. V. Sethuraman
C. K. Nagaratnam
V. Saroja

Soundtrack
Music was composed by S. V. Venkatraman and T. R. Ramanathan while the lyrics were penned by Papanasam Rajagopala Iyer. The songs had a patriotic theme with social values and were acclaimed by the people.

Reception
The film fared well at the box office and is remembered for the splendid performance of V. N. Janaki and for the songs with social themed lyrics and pleasing music.

References

Indian drama films
Films scored by S. V. Venkatraman
1947 drama films
1947 films
Indian black-and-white films
Films scored by T. R. Ramanathan